Destination image is one of the most popular research topics in the tourism academic literature. For any given travel situation, consumers are spoilt by choice of available destinations, and the images held of destination play a critical role in purchase decisions. Destination image therefore plays a major role in the competitiveness of travel destinations. For major reviews on the destination image literature see

References 

Tourism marketing